East Garston railway station was a railway station in East Garston, Berkshire, UK, on the Lambourn Valley Railway.

History 
The station opened on 4 April 1898. The station primarily handled dairy produce, particularly milk churns. A coal yard at the station supplied local provided materials for local merchants.

The station closed to all traffic on 4 January 1960.

References 

Lambourn Valley Railway
Disused railway stations in Berkshire
Former Great Western Railway stations
Railway stations in Great Britain opened in 1898
Railway stations in Great Britain closed in 1960